Passing–Bablok regression is a method from robust statistics for nonparametric regression analysis suitable for method comparison studies introduced by Wolfgang Bablok and Heinrich Passing in 1983.

 The procedure is adapted to fit linear errors-in-variables models. It is symmetrical and is robust in the presence of one or few outliers. 
The median is shifted based on the number of slopes where  to create an approximately consistent estimator. The estimator is therefore close in spirit to the Theil-Sen estimator.

In 1986, Passing and Bablok extended their method introducing an equivariant extension for method transformation which also works when the slope  is far from 1.
It may be considered a robust version of reduced major axis regression. The slope estimator  is the median of the absolute values of all pairwise slopes.

However, fast quasilinear algorithms of complexity  ln  have been devised. .

The results are interpreted as follows. If 0 is not in the CI of  there is a systematic difference and if 1 is not in the CI of  then there is a proportional difference between the two methods.

However, the use of Passing–Bablok regression in method comparison studies has been criticized because it ignores random differences between methods.

References

Analytical chemistry
Medical statistics